Stanwell is a village close to two of the three main towns in the Borough of Spelthorne, Surrey, about  west of central London. A small corner of its land is vital industrial land serving Heathrow Airport – most of the rest is residential/recreational, and the housing ranges from suburban homes with gardens to low- to mid-rise urban apartment blocks. Historically part of the county of Middlesex, it has, like the rest of Spelthorne, been in Surrey since 1965. The village is to the south of the cargo-handling area of Heathrow Airport and to the east of the Staines Reservoirs.

Its recognisable extent has been substantially cut three times – all in the 20th century. Land was taken for reservoirs in about 1900; a few decades later land was taken into Heathrow Airport; and in 1995, after the completion of the M25 motorway, the settlement of Poyle (beyond Stanwell Moor) was detached from the Borough and reassigned to Colnbrook in the Borough of Slough.

Stanwell Moor is seen as its own village since the 1870s secularisation of local government. It likewise has reservoirs in its historical area. It was recognised as a manor in medieval times. It has a few pasture/horse-riding fields, horticultural businesses and flood meadows. It is centred  from the historical nucleus of Stanwell and is part of the same ward and ecclesiastical parish.

Since the 1945 naming of Ashford Hospital, after two other re-namings, from the Staines Poor Law Union Infirmary, the far south of Stanwell has been widely conflated as being part of Ashford by visitors and some residents. This is reinforced by a large supermarket adopting the Ashford name and by the ease of delivery-made borders of the TW15 versus TW19 postal districts.

History

There are two theories regarding the origin of the name Stanwell. One is that it was named after St Ann(e)'s well in the village, but according to all known records the parish church has always been dedicated to St Mary. The second is that it means 'stone well', referring to stony soil or the adjoining street to the south. The first few letters of the name are the same as in the name of neighbouring Staines-upon-Thames, which also is said to mean 'stones', in the same way as the Great Vowel Shift failed to influence the spelling and pronunciation of the contemporaneously pronounced Stane Streets (i.e. stone streets), the Old English for many of the stone-laid Roman roads in Britain.

The Domesday Book of 1086 records 'Stanwelle' held by Walter, son of Othere. This places it among the large minority of head manors retained by men with Anglo-Saxon names. Its Domesday assets were: 15 hide, 4 mills worth £3 10s 0d and 375 eels, 3 weirs worth 1000 eels, 10 ploughs, meadow for 12 ploughs and woodland worth 12 hogs. It rendered £14 per year to its feudal system overlords. The fruitful watercourse was the western border of the village and of Middlesex, the River Colne West Bedfont may have been a hamlet of Stanwell in 1086; however, the dividing line between West Bedfont hamlet in Stanwell parish and East Bedfont in the parish of Bedfont (now in Greater London) may not have been drawn before the 11th or 12th century. West Bedfont along with Rudsworth are no longer used by residents (as localities, hamlets, neighbourhoods). In the Middle Ages the parish was mostly open fields

In 1603, Thomas Knyvet was granted the manor of Stanwell. Knyvet was the man who arrested Guy Fawkes in his attempt to blow up the Houses of Parliament. He was created Lord Knyvet in 1607, and in his will left money to found a free school in Stanwell, which was established in 1624. The building is no longer a school and now belongs to a  housing association. It is Grade II* listed. However Thomas Knyvett College, bears his name in the twenty-first century.

James VI and I's infant daughter Mary died at Stanwell while in the care of the Knyvet household. Several members of the aristocracy lived there in the 17th and 18th centuries. The Cox's Orange Pippin was first grown c. 1830 by Richard Cox in his garden on the Bath Road within the parish, see Colnbrook which now has this piece of land.

An unknown species of rose was found in a local garden in 1838, and given the name of Stanwell Perpetual.

Hounslow Heath extended over the area north of Bedfont Road until 1792, and a strip of moorland (Borough Green and Spout Moor) along the present Spout Lane joined it to Hither Moor and Farther Moor, which stretched towards Staines Moor. There were lammas lands in the far east and elsewhere and meadows along many of the river banks, particularly in the north, but the remainder of the parish was largely arable land. Nearly all the land west of Stanwell Moor's clustered centre and that around Hammonds Farm was enclosed by the mid-18th century. Borough Field, to the north and west of the manor-house, and another small field nearby were inclosed in 1771 by the lord of the manor. Most of the area south of Stanwell and West Bedfont villages remained open until 1792 on their enclosure.

By the 18th century the remaining common land was generally known as Stanwell Field or Town Field until its enclosure. Orchards and market gardens began to spread over the parish in the second half of the 19th century. The Staines and West Drayton Railway (now closed) was opened in 1884, with Colnbrook railway station in Stanwell parish at Poyle, after the then neighbouring village. The streets of small houses behind the southwest Crooked Billet roundabout (named after a demolished pub) were built in the 1880s. As a community they formed part of Staines, and were transferred to it officially in 1896.

The Staines Union Workhouse was built on the London Road in the mid-19th century. Together with a former boys' home and a former isolation hospital, both opened about 1913, it became Ashford Hospital. Two cemeteries were opened near the A30 between 1895 and 1910. The Staines Reservoirs were completed in 1902 and started supplying water to London in 1904. Between them they cover .

The two old settlements grew slightly, notably by the building of council housing estates in Stanwell in 1919 and in Stanwell Moor in 1930. A private motor-bus served the village by 1926, and London Transport buses began in 1932. Poyle Halt on the defunct railway opened in 1927 and Poyle Industrial Estate Halt in 1953. Housing society and council house building began after the Second World War, including 300 pre-fabricated homes. From 1930, having formed part of a 19th-century Sanitary District then Rural District, Stanwell was administered by Staines Urban District (of the county of Middlesex) until its 1974 dissolution. In 1965 were it not for special provision Stanwell would have seceded with the rest of Middlesex to London: the Staines, Sunbury and Potters Bar Urban Districts transferred variously to Surrey and Hertfordshire, the most distant parts of the county from London.

The civil parish, with its wider functions than those surviving today, was abolished in 1930.  It was relatively active; it intervened with partial success in the negotiations for the building of the reservoirs and saw the provision of allotments in 1918 and of a recreation ground in 1927. Its first complaint about dangerous driving along the London Road was made in 1909. In addition to the overseer, who was unpaid, the council had two salaried assistant overseers, one of whom was also clerk to the council and the other of whom was the rate collector. The council protested against the inclusion of Stanwell in Staines Urban District, which nevertheless took place, so that the council was dissolved.

On Heathrow's construction
In the northwest of the parish, off Spout Lane, Middlesex County Council established 24 small holdings in the early 1930s: Burrows Hill Close estate and Bedfont Court. The part of Stanwell New Road north of Park Road opened as a main north–south route in 1948. The following year, most of the former Hounslow Heath land to the north-east, predominantly in Harmondsworth, became London Airport. The east end of the local road to Bedfont was diverted, and the roads running north were turned over, together with the eastern half of Spout Lane, where houses were demolished.

In 2004, the village of Stanwell won a bronze medal in the national Britain in Bloom competition, in the urban community category.

Notable buildings

Parish church

The Church of England parish church of St Mary the Virgin is a Norman building with a 14th-century Gothic chancel and 15th-century Perpendicular Gothic west tower. The tower has a spire with wood shingles. Inside the church are monuments to members of the Knyvet(t) family who bought Staines manor after their foiling of the planting of the gunpowder and Fawkes.

The church was restored in 1862 under the direction of Samuel Sanders Teulon, and restored again in 1903. The building is Grade I listed.

Stanwell Place

The Gibbons family owned the manorial rights from 1754 to 1933, and slowly sold off the estate from the 1800s. Sold to John Watson Gibson in 1933, four years later  were sold off to the Metropolitan Water Board for the development of the King George VI Reservoir, now in Staines. After Gibson's death in 1947, Stanwell Place was sold to King Faisal II of Iraq who owned it until his assassination in 1958. The estate was then purchased for gravel extraction, and despite local attempts to prevent it, the house was allowed to become derelict, and demolished in the 1960s.

Economy
What was the north of the parish is a major industrial, distribution and headquarters zone, bound up now in the broad expression 'the M4 corridor'. There was little building in the parish before World War I. The first factory/warehouse at Poyle appeared before 1914 another at West Bedfont in the 1920s. By 1956 there were between 70 and 80 at Poyle, and several at West Bedfont. During the 1920s and 1930s ribbon development spread along the main roads: on the A4 Bath Road Colnbrook remains mainly residential. Garages and a few small factories (now motor manufacturer garages and offices) had been built by the 1950s and remain along the A30 London Road, including Del Monte, Ford and Suzuki.

At one time British Mediterranean Airways was headquartered at the Cirrus House within the post town but in the London Borough of Hounslow, near Stanwell.

Politics
Stanwell has historically been one of the few wards of Surrey County Council held by the Labour Party.

Demography and housing

The average level of accommodation in the region composed of detached houses was 28%, the average that was apartments was 22.6%.

The proportion of households in the settlement who owned their home outright compares to the regional average of 35.1%. The proportion who owned their home with a loan compares to the regional average of 32.5%. The remaining % is made up of rented dwellings (plus a negligible % of households living rent-free).

Notable residents

Thomas Knyvet, 1st Baron Knyvet, Member of Parliament in 1601, was granted the manor of Stanwell for uncovering the Gunpowder Plot in 1603
Nicholas Hilliard, painter, leased Poyle Manor
James Nares, English organist and composer, was born in Stanwell in 1715 and married Teresa Costello
Richard Cox, British horticulturist, created Cox's Orange Pippin apple, first grown in his garden on the Bath Road
Sir John Watson Gibson, civil engineer, lived in Stanwell Lodge and then Stanwell Place between the 1920s and his death in 1947 Since 2015, one of the town's pubs has borne his name
Sir Allen Lane, the founder of Penguin Books, lived at Silverbeck, Stanwell Moor 
King Faisal II of Iraq owned Stanwell Place from 1948 until his assassination in 1958
Gary Numan, singer, was raised in Stanwell and attended Abbotsford School
Pete Shaw, author and theatrical producer, was raised in Short Lane, Stanwell

See also

Middlesex
Spelthorne Hundred
Stanwell Park, New South Wales

References

Sources

Villages in Surrey
Borough of Spelthorne
Former civil parishes in Surrey
Places formerly in Middlesex